Nebria splendida is a species of ground beetle in the Nebriinae subfamily that is endemic to Kazakhstan.

References

splendida
Beetles described in 1844
Beetles of Asia
Endemic fauna of Kazakhstan